In surgery or medical procedure, a ligature consists of a piece of thread (suture) tied around an anatomical structure, usually a blood vessel, another hollow structure (e.g. urethra) or an accessory skin tag to shut it off.

History
The principle of ligation is attributed to Hippocrates and Galen. In ancient Rome, ligatures were used to treat hemorrhoids. The concept of a ligature was reintroduced some 1,500 years later by Ambroise Paré, and finally it found its modern use in 1870–80, made popular by Jules-Émile Péan.

Procedure
With a blood vessel the surgeon will clamp the vessel perpendicular to the axis of the artery or vein with a hemostat, then secure it by ligating it; i.e. using a piece of suture around it before dividing the structure and releasing the hemostat. It is different from a tourniquet in that the tourniquet will not be secured by knots and it can therefore be released/tightened at will.

Ligation is one of the remedies to treat skin tag, or acrochorda. It is done by tying string or dental floss around the acrochordon to cut off the blood circulation.
Home remedies include commercial ligation bands that can be placed around the base of skin tags.

Complications of ligation in polydactyly treatment include infection, neuroma or cyst formation.

See also 
 Elastrator
 Surgical suture
 Cheesewiring

References

Surgical procedures and techniques

kk:Лигатура